The Rohini East metro station is located on the Red Line of the Delhi Metro. It is an elevated station and is located in Sector 8 & Sector 14 of Rohini in Delhi, India. The station was inaugurated on 31 March 2004.

Station layout

See also
List of Delhi Metro stations
Transport in Delhi

References

External links

 Delhi Metro Rail Corporation Ltd. (Official site)
 Delhi Metro Map showing all the Delhi Metro Routes and Lines

Delhi Metro stations
Railway stations opened in 2004
Railway stations in North West Delhi district